Eublarginea is a genus of moths of the family Noctuidae. The genus was erected by Emilio Berio in 1966.

Species
Eublarginea argentifera Berio, 1966 Madagascar
Eublarginea niviceps Hacker & Saldaitis, 2019

References

External links

Acontiinae